Nights in Andalusia is a 1938 German musical film directed by Herbert Maisch and starring Imperio Argentina, Friedrich Benfer and Karl Klüsner.  It is based on the opera Carmen by Georges Bizet, itself based on the novella Carmen by Prosper Mérimée. It was shot at the Babelsberg Studios in Berlin. The film's sets were designed by the art director Franz Schroedter. A Spanish-language version Carmen, la de Triana was made at the same time. The making of the film was an influence on the 1998 Spanish film The Girl of Your Dreams.

Cast
 Imperio Argentina as Carmen, a Gypsy girl
 Friedrich Benfer as Don José
 Karl Klüsner as Antonio Vargas Heredia
 Erwin Biegel as Salvadore
 Edwin Juergenssen as Major
 Siegfried Schürenberg as Rittmeister Moraleda
 Hans Adalbert Schlettow as Sergeant Garcia
 Kurt Seifert as Juan
 Hans Hessling as Triqui
 Albert Venohr as Ein Schmuggler
 Ernst Legal as Wirt in Sevilla
 Margit Symo as Eine Tänzerin
 Maria Koppenhöfer as Eine Wahrsagerin
 Friedrich Ettel as Wirt einer Herberge
 Milena von Eckhardt as Kellnerin

References

Bibliography 
 Niven, Bill, Hitler and Film: The Führer's Hidden Passion. Yale University Press, 2018.

External links

1938 films
Films of Nazi Germany
1938 musical films
1930s German-language films
Films directed by Herbert Maisch
Films based on Carmen
German multilingual films
Films set in the 19th century
Films set in Spain
Georges Bizet
German black-and-white films
Films based on adaptations
German musical films
1938 multilingual films
Films about Romani people
1930s German films
Films shot at Babelsberg Studios
UFA GmbH films